The Switzerland men's national water polo team is the representative for Switzerland in international men's water polo.

Results

Olympic Games
1920 — 11th place
1924 — 12th place
1928 — 12th place
1936 — 12th place
1948 — 14th place

References

Water polo
Men's national water polo teams
National water polo teams in Europe
National water polo teams by country
 
Men's sport in Switzerland